There are several lists of United States Congress members who died in office. These include:

List of United States Congress members who died in office (1790–1899)
List of United States Congress members who died in office (1900–1949)
List of United States Congress members who died in office (1950–1999)
List of United States Congress members who died in office (2000–)

See also
Deaths of United States federal judges in active service
List of presidents of the United States who died in office